Eriogonum pusillum is a species of wild buckwheat known by the common name yellowturbans. It is native to the western United States where it grows in sandy soils in a number of habitats, especially in the Mojave Desert and Great Basin.

Description
This is a small annual herb reaching heights of anywhere from 5 to 30 centimeters. The woolly leaves are located at the base of the plant and are about a centimeter long and rounded.

The spindly naked branches of the inflorescence rise and branch, producing cup-shaped flower clusters at each node along the branches. Each tiny, glandular flower is about three millimeters wide at its maximum and turns from bright yellow to orange-red to red.

Desert tortoise
This is a food plant for the desert tortoise (Gopherus agassizii).

External links
Jepson Manual Treatment - Eriogonum pusillum
Eriogonum pusillum - Photo gallery

pusillum
Flora of the Southwestern United States
Flora of Oregon
Flora of Nevada
Flora of the California desert regions
Flora of the Great Basin
Flora of the Sonoran Deserts
Flora of California
Natural history of the Santa Monica Mountains
Flora without expected TNC conservation status